The 2019 World Para Alpine Skiing Championships was an international disability sport alpine skiing event held in two cities: Sella Nevea, Italy from 21 to 24 January with slalom and giant slalom and Kranjska Gora, Slovenia from 28 to 31 January with Super-G, downhill and super combined events. The Championship is held biannually by the International Paralympic Committee (IPC).

Medal summary

Medal table

Men's events

Women's events

Participating nations
28 nations participated.

References

External links
World Para Alpine Skiing website

World Para Alpine Skiing Championships
Alpine skiing competitions in Italy
Alpine skiing competitions in Slovakia
World Para Alpine Skiing